The Márquez River is a river of Bolivia in the Oruro Department. It empties into Poopo Lake in the southern part of the lake.

See also
List of rivers of Bolivia

References
Rand McNally, The New International Atlas, 1993.

Rivers of Oruro Department